Willie Evans (21 November 1939 – c. 2014) was a Ghanaian footballer who played at both professional and international levels as a defender.

Career

Professional
Evans played professional soccer in the United States, competing in the NPSL, NASL and ASL for the Atlanta Chiefs, the Washington Darts, and the Miami Toros. He was named to the 1969 ASL All-Star Team.

International
Evans played international football for Ghana, and started on the team that won the 1965 African Cup of Nations in Tunisia.

References

External links
 

1939 births
Date of death unknown
2014 deaths
Africa Cup of Nations-winning players
Ghanaian footballers
Ghanaian expatriate footballers
Ghana international footballers
1965 African Cup of Nations players
National Professional Soccer League (1967) players
North American Soccer League (1968–1984) players
American Soccer League (1933–1983) players
Atlanta Chiefs players
Washington Darts players
Miami Toros players
Ghanaian expatriate sportspeople in the United States
Expatriate soccer players in the United States
Association football defenders